Italian-occupied Corsica refers to the military (and administrative) occupation by the Kingdom of Italy of the island of Corsica during the Second World War, from November 1942 to September 1943. After an initial period of increased control over the island, by early spring 1943 the  had begun to occupy the hinterland.

Background

Operation Torch
On 8 November 1942, the western Allies landed in North Africa in Operation Torch. The Germans implemented a contingency plan, Case Anton to occupy the  the part of France not occupied in 1940. The plan included   (11 November) an Italian occupation of the French island of Corsica and mainland France up to the Rhone. The Italian occupation of Corsica had been strongly promoted by Italian irredentism by the Fascist regime.

Italian occupation

Italian garrison
The 20th Infantry Division "Friuli", of VII Corps made an unopposed landing on Corsica. The absence of Corsican resistance and a desire to avoid problems with the Vichy French limited the Italian recruitment of Corsicans, except for a labour battalion in March 1943. The Corsican population initially showed some support for the Italians, partly as a consequence of irredentist propaganda. The  VII Corps garrison eventually comprised the 20th Infantry Division "Friuli" and 44th Infantry Division "Cremona", the 225th Coastal Division and the 226th Coastal Division, a battalion of Alpini and an armoured battalion. The garrison was commanded by  Umberto Mondino until the end of December 1942, when  Giacomo Carboni took over until March 1943, followed by  Giovanni Magli until September 1943. The initial occupation force of 30,000 Italian troops rose to just under 85,000 men, a huge number relative to the Corsican population of 220,000.

Collaboration

Some Corsican military officers collaborated with Italy, including Major Pantalacci (ret.) and his son Antonio, Colonel Mondielli, Colonel Simon Petru Cristofini and Marta Renucci, his wife, the first Corsican female journalist. He worked with the Corsican writer Petru Giovacchini, who was named as the potential Governor of Corsica, if Italy annexed the island. In the first months of 1943 the irredentists, under the leadership of Giovacchini and Bertino Poli, conducted mass propaganda to the public, promoting the unification of Corsica as a "Corsica Governorate", similar to the Governatorate of Dalmatia of 1941. Public support for the Italian occupation was lukewarm until the summer 1943. Benito Mussolini postponed unification until a peace treaty after the anticipated Axis victory, mainly because of German opposition to irredentist claims.

Administration
This helped to maintain calm on the island during the first months of Italian occupation. On 14 November 1943, the  restated French sovereignty over the island and stated that the Italian troops had been occupiers.

Resistance
Resistance by the Corsicans increased during the Italian occupation. The  (secret mission Pearl Harbor) commanded by Roger de Saule, arrived from Algiers on 14 December 1942 on the Free French submarine  ( Jean l'Herminier). The  network was originally formed in connexion with the Gaullist resistance in January 1943. Its leader, Fred Scamaroni, failed to unite the movements and was later captured and tortured, committing suicide on 19 March 1943. In April 1943, Paulin Colonna d'Istria was dispatched from Algeria by de Gaulle to unite the movements. The  leadership was reinforced and morale was boosted by six visits by Casabianca, carrying personnel and arms, later supplemented by air drops. The  became more ambitious and established control, especially over the countryside, by the summer of 1943. On 30 August, Jean Nicoli and two French partisans of the Front National were shot in Bastia, by order of an Italian Fascist War Tribunal.

Liberation 1943

On 8 November 1942, the western Allies began Operation Torch, landings in French North Africa (Morocco and Algeria).
The Axis implemented  (Case Anton), a plan for the occupation of Vichy France and Italian forces carried out , occcupying Corsica and mainland France west to the Rhône. The Italian Special Naval Force, originally intended for the invasion of Malta, disembarked at Bastia in the north-east of Corsica on the night of 11/12 November; other forces landed at Ajaccio and Porto Vecchio.

On 7 September, General Fridolin von Senger und Etterlin arrived to take command. Senger received assurances from the Italian commander,  Giovanni Magli, that the Italian garrison would continue to fight against the local resistance and not oppose the arrival of German troops from Sardinia. There were about 20,000 French  on the island and the Germans suspected that many of the Italians would defect.

Operation Achse

At the First Quebec Conference 17–24 August 1943, the Allies had decided not to occupy Sardinia and Corsica until Italy had capitulated and Allied air bases had been established around Rome.  (Operation Axis), a German plan to forestall an Italian surrender and defection to the Allies, began on 8 September, which included the evacuation of the garrisons of Sardinia to Corsica. When news of the Armistice was announced on 8 September, German forces began to embark from the ports of La Maddalena and Santa Teresa Gallura on the north coast of Sardinia, landing at Porto-Vecchio and Bonifacio in Corsica, the Italian coastal gunners nearby not interfering with the operation. The Germans used craft available since the evacuation of Sicily and such barges that could be diverted from transporting fuel from Leghorn (Livorno) to the front in Italy, to shift troops from Sardinia to Corsica.  moved to Ghisonaccia Airfield in Corsica on 10 September, becoming  and the next day the last 44  aircraft in Sardinia arrived.

Action off Bastia

The merchant ship Humanitas (7,980 gross register tons (GRT)) and a MAS boat were also damaged but the  managed to sail at the last moment. The next day, Italian troops counter-attacked and forced the Germans out; the port commander ordered Commander Fecia di Cossato, the captain of Aliseo, to prevent Germans ships in the harbour from escaping. At dawn on 9 September, lookouts on Aliseo spotted German ships leaving the harbour in the early-morning mist and turning north, close to the coast.

At  Aliseo was hit in the engine room and brought to a stop but the damage was quickly repaired. Aliseo caught up with the German ships again and hit UJ2203 and some of the barges. At  UJ2203 exploded with the loss of nine of the crew. Aliseo fired on UJ2219 and after ten minutes it exploded and sank. The barges, which were well armed and had been firing continuously, separated but three were sunk by  At  Aliseo attacked another two barges, which were also under fire from Italian shore batteries and the corvette Cormorano and their crews beached them. Aliseo rescued 25 Germans but 160 had been killed.

Evacuation of Sardinia
From 8 to 15 September, the Germans conducted demolitions on seven Sardinian airfields but Italian aircraft had begun landing on other airfields on 10 September, some en route to Sicily and Tunisia to join the Allies, others to operate from Sardinia with the Allies. Five Cant Z 1007 bombers attacked German ships in the Bay of Bonifacio on 16 September and  aircraft retaliated with attacks on Sardinian airfields for the next four days. In Sardinia the XII Paratroopers Battalion of the 184th Paratroopers Division "Nembo" defected to the Germans.

Operation Vesuvius

The Free French General, Henri Giraud, feared that the Maquis on Corsica would be crushed unless the Allies intervened and gained the agreement of the Allied supreme commander of the North African Theater of Operations, General Dwight D. Eisenhower, to intervene. Eisenhower stipulated that no Allied forces engaged in Operation Avalanche, the landings at Salerno (9–16 September) could be spared and the French must use their own ships and troops.

On 12 September, Hitler ordered Corsica to be abandoned and  von Liebenstein, the commander of the Sicily evacuation, was sent to Corsica to supervise the naval withdrawal. The Germans planned to concentrate in the north-east of Corsica and use the port of Bastia and the airfields nearby to evacuate the German garrison to the Italian mainland (Livorno and Piombino) and to the island of Elba, between Corsica and Tuscany. Until 24 September,  transport aircraft operated from Ghisonaccia Airfield, about half-way up the east coast, to mainland airfields at Pisa, Lucca, Arena Metato and Pratica di Mare then closed the airfield. On 25 September, the air evacuation resumed from Bastia. 

On 17 September, French General Henry Martin had met Italian General Giovanni Magli in Corte to coordinate the movements of Allied and Italian troops. On the 21st, Giraud arrived in Corsica. On the 22nd, Sartène was definitively liberated and on the 23rd, advanced troops and Corsican resistance fighters reached Porto-Vecchio. 
The Italian troops of the 20th Infantry Division "Friuli" would now play a decisive role. With the participation of Moroccan colonial troops, they took the San Stefano pass on 30 September and then the Teghime pass on 3 October, pressing the German withdrawal. But they were unable to stop the evacuation, which was completed on 3 October.

German losses during the liberation amounted to around 700 killed and wounded and 350 captured. The Italians lost 600 to 800 soldiers killed and 2,000 wounded, including many members of the Friuli division. The French suffer 75 killed, 239 wounded and 12 missing.

The transport of Allied forces to Corsica had continued and on 21 September, 1,200 men,  of stores, six guns and six vehicles were delivered by the light cruiser  and the destroyers Le Fantastique, Tempête and L'Alcyon. On 30 September 200 men, four guns, seventy vehicles arrived on Le Fortuné and LST-79, which had been damaged by air attack and sank in the harbour.

The island became an important base for the United States Army Air Forces and Navy for the continuation of operations in Italy, and then for the Landing in the Provence (August 1944). Therefore, the island was nicknamed the USS Corsica.

Aftermath

Post-war reprisals
Nearly 100 collaborators or autonomists (including intellectuals) were put on trial by the French authorities in 1946. Among those found guilty, eight were sentenced to death. Seven of the death sentences were commuted and one irredentist was executed, Petru Cristofini, convicted of treason. He tried to kill himself and was executed while he was dying in November 1943. Petru Giovacchini was forced to hide after the Allied re-occupation of the island. Prosecuted by a Free French tribunal in Corsica, he received a death sentence in 1945 and went into exile in Canterano, near Rome. He died in September 1955 from old war wounds. Since his death, the Italian irredentist movement in Corsica has been considered to be defunct.

Italian order of battle

Details from Barba 1995.
 Coast (16 battalions)
 225th Coastal Division (General Pedrotti)
 226th Coastal Division (General Lazzarini)
 detached regiment
 North
 20th Infantry Division "Friuli"
  (landing group)
 Blackshirt battalion (Consul Cognoni)
 South-west 
 44th Infantry Division "Cremona" (General Primieri)
   Ticchioni.
 Central
 10th   Fucci
 175th   Castagna
  ( Gaetano Catalano Gonzaga)
 Bastia
 Portovecchio
 Ajaccio
  ( Baudoin)
 Borgo
 Ghisonaccia
 Ajaccio
 Portovecchio
 Campo dell'Oro (airfields all on the eastern lowlands)

See also
 History of Corsica
 Italian irredentism in Corsica
 Italian occupation of France during World War II
 Military history of Italy during World War II
 Royal Italian Army (1940–1946)

Notes

Footnotes

References

Further reading
 
 
 
 
 
 
 
 
 

1942 in France
1942 in Italy
1943 in France
1943 in Italy
France–Italy relations
Military history of Corsica
Italian irredentism
Italian military occupations
Military history of France during World War II
Military history of Italy during World War II
Military occupations of France
World War II occupied territories
November 1942 events